The Leçons de ténèbres pour le mercredi saint ("Tenebrae Readings for Holy Wednesday") are a series of three vocal pieces composed by François Couperin for the liturgies of Holy Week, 1714, at the Abbaye royale de Longchamp.

Couperin's Leçons de ténèbres use the Latin text of the Old Testament Book of Lamentations, in which Jeremiah deplores the destruction of Jerusalem by the Babylonians.

Musical settings of the Lamentations of Jeremiah the Prophet were common in the Renaissance, famous polyphonic examples being those by Thomas Tallis, Tomás Luis de Victoria, Lassus, and Carlo Gesualdo. Leçons de ténèbres were a particular French subgenre of this music with other similar settings being composed by Marc-Antoine Charpentier, Michel Delalande and others.

Those by Couperin are for two high vocalists and basso continuo. They are composed of three lessons (two other sets of three for Thursday and Friday having been lost). Each Latin verse is preceded by a melisma on the first letter of the Hebrew text. The first two were composed for one single voice, while the third was written for two voices. This last Leçon, where the two voices perform superb appoggiatura, ornaments, dissonances and vocalizing, is considered one of the undisputed peaks of Baroque vocal music.

A 1954 recording of these works serves as the theme music for the 1968 film Phèdre, featuring Marie Bell. The recording, conducted by Laurence Boulay, was released on the French label Erato.

See also
 Tenebrae

References

External links
 

1714 compositions
Book of Lamentations
Compositions by François Couperin
French Christian hymns
Tenebrae
Vocal musical compositions
18th-century hymns